Murtaza Syed is a Pakistani economist and policymaker who served as acting governor of the State Bank of Pakistan.

References

Living people
Governors of the State Bank of Pakistan
Pakistani economists
Year of birth missing (living people)